Jin Bingjie (金 冰洁 - Jīn Bīngjié; born 1 April 1971 in Liaoning) is a retired Chinese race walker.

She won the bronze medal in the 5000 m walk at the 1986 World Junior Championships in Athletics then took third a year later in the 10 km race at the 1987 IAAF World Race Walking Cup.

In 1990 she set an Asian record and world junior record of 20:37.7 minutes for the 5000 km track walk. This stood as the best Asian mark over twenty years, finally being beaten by Liu Hong.

Achievements

References

External links

1971 births
Living people
Chinese female racewalkers
Asian Games medalists in athletics (track and field)
Athletes from Liaoning
Athletes (track and field) at the 1990 Asian Games
Asian Games silver medalists for China
Medalists at the 1990 Asian Games